Chelis reticulata is a moth in the family Erebidae. It was described by Hugo Theodor Christoph in 1887. It is found in the Caucasus, Transcaucasia, Armenia, the Kopet Dagh, Asia Minor, Syria, northern Lebanon and northern Iran.

Subspecies
Chelis reticulata reticulata (Kopet Dagh)
Chelis reticulata schwingenschussi Daniel, 1933 (Lebanon)
Chelis reticulata sultana Schwingenschuss, 1938 (Turkey)
Chelis reticulata transcaucasica Dubatolov, 1988 (Armenia, Caucasus, Transcaucasia)

References

Arctiidae genus list at Butterflies and Moths of the World of the Natural History Museum, London

Moths described in 1887
Arctiina